Dirty Heads is the fifth studio album by reggae/rock/rap hybrid band the Dirty Heads. The album was released on July 15, 2016.

Track listing

Personnel
 Dustin "Duddy B" Bushnell – lead vocals, guitar
 Jared "Dirty J" Watson – lead vocals
 David Foral - bass guitar
 Jon Olazabal - percussion
 Matt Ochoa – drums

Charts

References 

2016 albums
Dirty Heads albums
Five Seven Music albums